Francisco Ramon Albelda Tormo (born 11 October 1955) is a Spanish former professional racing cyclist. He rode in three editions of the Tour de France and one edition of the Vuelta a España.

References

External links
 

1955 births
Living people
Spanish male cyclists
People from Ribera Alta (comarca)
Sportspeople from the Province of Valencia
Cyclists from the Valencian Community